Andrew Francis Bennett (born 9 March 1939) is a retired British Labour Party politician.  He was the Member of Parliament (MP) Stockport North 1974 from 1983, and then for Denton and Reddish from 1983 to 2005.

Early life
Bennett was born in Barton-upon-Irwell. He attended the William Hulme's Grammar School in Whalley Range. He studied at the University of Birmingham gaining a BSocSc (Bachelor of Social Science). A geography teacher from 1960 to 1974, Bennett was elected to Oldham Borough Council in 1964, and served on it until 1974.

Parliamentary career
He contested the Knutsford parliamentary seat in 1970 and was elected to Parliament in February 1974 for the marginal constituency of Stockport North, defeating the Conservative incumbent Idris Owen by just 203 votes. Following boundary changes, he was elected MP for Denton and Reddish in 1983. From 1983 to 1988 he served on the Labour front bench as a shadow Education and Science minister. He was chairman of the House of Commons Committee on Statutory Instruments .

He rebelled against the Labour government on various issues, including the privatisation of National Air Traffic Services.

He retired at the 2005 general election, and the seat was held for Labour by Andrew Gwynne.

Personal life
He married Gillian Lawley in 1961 in Manchester. They have two sons and a daughter.

External links
 BBC Profile
 They Work For You
 Public Whip
 

1939 births
Living people
Labour Party (UK) MPs for English constituencies
UK MPs 1974
UK MPs 1974–1979
UK MPs 1979–1983
UK MPs 1983–1987
UK MPs 1987–1992
UK MPs 1992–1997
UK MPs 1997–2001
UK MPs 2001–2005
People educated at William Hulme's Grammar School
Alumni of the University of Birmingham